Esad Muharemović (born 22 February 1965), known by his stage name Esad Plavi ("Esad the Blond / Blond Esad") is a Bosnian pop-folk singer. Esad's best known songs are "Šeherezada", popular with young females, and "Babo". Esad is the twin brother of Bosnian singer Jasmin Muharemović.

Personal life and career 

Born in Tešanj, Esad's life was affected by his father's death. His talent was discovered at his brother's wedding party where Esad sang. His first contract was signed in 1989, and after a year he released his debut album Ne kuni što si voljela (Don't curse what you have loved).

Discography
Ne kuni što si volela (1990)
Reci srećo (1991)
Ima dana i kafana (1993)
Daš, ne daš (1994)
Preboljet ću ove noći (2000)
Evo mene nakon svega (2001)
Put me zove (2003)
Kao nekad (2005)
Ostavi nešto svoje (2009)
Kupih burmu u Serije na Jelahu (2010)

References

1965 births
People from Tešanj
Living people
Bosniaks of Bosnia and Herzegovina
20th-century Bosnia and Herzegovina male singers
BN Music artists
Bosnia and Herzegovina folk-pop singers
21st-century Bosnia and Herzegovina male singers